Devi Tika Permatasari (born 14 December 1987) is an Indonesian badminton player. In the mixed doubles event, she won international titles at the 2009 and 2013 Indonesia International, and the 2012 Maldives International. In the women's doubles event, she was the champion of the Auckland International.

Achievements

World University Championships 
Women's doubles

BWF Grand Prix 
The BWF Grand Prix had two levels, the Grand Prix and Grand Prix Gold. It was a series of badminton tournaments sanctioned by the Badminton World Federation (BWF) and played between 2007 and 2017.

Women's doubles

  BWF Grand Prix Gold tournament
  BWF Grand Prix tournament

BWF International Challenge/Series 
Women's doubles

Mixed doubles

  BWF International Challenge tournament
  BWF International Series tournament

Performance timeline

Individual competitions 
 Senior level

References

External links 
 
 

1997 births
Living people
People from Kediri (city)
Sportspeople from East Java
Indonesian female badminton players
20th-century Indonesian women
21st-century Indonesian women